Francis Charles Polsfoot (April 19, 1927  – April 5, 1985) was an American football player and coach. He played professionally as an end in the National Football League (NFL) with the Chicago Cardinals from 1950 to 1952 and the Washington Redskins in 1953. Polsfoot played college football at Washington State and was drafted in the third round of the 1950 NFL Draft. He caught 57 passes in the 1951 season for the Chicago Cardinals and was selected to the Pro Bowl.

After Polsfoot suffered a knee injury and was forced to retire following the 1953 season, he started his coaching career at the University of Wisconsin–River Falls. In 1962, he returned to the NFL as an assistant coach with the St. Louis Cardinals. Polsfoot later coached with the Houston Oilers, Cleveland Browns and Denver Broncos. His NFL coaching career lasted over 20 years and he was an assistant coach for the Broncos in Super Bowl XII.

Polsfoot was also a high hurdle champion for Washington State.

Polsfoot was married to Mary Eileen ( Hesterman) and the couple had two children, Sally Baldwin and Thomas Polsfoot. He had a brother, Curtis Frederic Polsfoot, and a sister, Bea Polsfoot. Both Francis and Curt served in the United States Merchant Marine during World War II. Polsfoot died on April 5, 1985 after suffering from brain cancer.

Head coaching record

Football

References

External links
 
 

1927 births
1985 deaths
American football ends
American male hurdlers
Chicago Cardinals players
Cleveland Browns coaches
Denver Broncos coaches
Houston Oilers coaches
St. Louis Cardinals (football) coaches
Washington Redskins players
Washington State Cougars football players
Wisconsin–River Falls Falcons football coaches
Wisconsin–River Falls Falcons men's basketball coaches
College men's track and field athletes in the United States
College track and field coaches in the United States
Eastern Conference Pro Bowl players
United States Merchant Mariners of World War II
People from Montesano, Washington
Coaches of American football from Washington (state)
Players of American football from Washington (state)
Basketball coaches from Washington (state)
Track and field athletes from Washington (state)
Deaths from brain cancer in the United States
Deaths from cancer in Colorado